Benson Building may refer to:

Benson Building (Ottumwa, Iowa)
Benson Building (Baltimore, Maryland)